RedBall Project is a public travelling street art piece by US-born artist Kurt Perschke. Considered “the world's longest-running street art work” the project consists of a 15 ft inflated red ball wedged in different city spaces in various cities around the world. Placed in a choreographed suite of installations within a city and usually lasting one or two weeks, each specific site lasts only one day. RedBall Project has received strong international media and public attention, and has been featured in several urban art books, art journals, and media.

Kurt Perschke
RedBall was created in 2001 by contemporary artist Kurt Perschke. Perschke is best known for his works in sculpture, video, collage, set design and public space. Other prominent works by Perschke include commissions for various institutions including The Contemporary Art Museum in St. Louis, Barcelona Museum of Contemporary Art, and Technisches Museum Wien. His set designs for Kate Weare Dance Company have also received critical accolades in The New York Times.  Born in Chicago, Perschke currently lives and works in Brooklyn, New York.

Design
The RedBall is 15 feet in diameter (4.5 meters) and weighs 269 pounds (122 kg) inflated or 250 pounds (110 kg) deflated.

Exhibitions

Lawsuits
In May 2013, Perschke filed a lawsuit against the European conglomerate Edenred, S.A. over the use of RedBall Project’s concept in a promotional campaign. The international law firm Gibson, Dunn & Crutcher took on the cross-border dispute and filed a complaint in Federal court against Edenred. The case was settled out of court. While the precise terms of the resolution remain confidential by mutual agreement, it has been reported as “a legal victory for RedBall Project”. Perschke said that he views the resolution as favorable because it was based on terms that respect his intellectual property rights. In 2015, Perschke accused Shell Oil Company to have used his concept of the RedBall project in a global print ad campaign. The accusation on artistic copyright infringement received media attention.  The ad campaign was ended, and the case was settled out of court.

Publications featuring RedBall Project
 "Big Art, Small Art" (Manco, Tristan), Thames & Hudson; 1 edition (October 14, 2014), 
 "Overs!ze" (Viction:ary), Victionary (May 24, 2013), 
 “Going Public” (R. Klanten, S. Ehmann, S. Borges, L. Feireiss Release), Gestalten (August 2012), 
 "The Red Rubber Ball at Work" (Caroll, Kevin), McGraw Hill (October 1, 2008), 
 "The Artist’s Guide" (Battenfield, Jackie), Da Capo Press (June 9, 2009), 
 "Creaticity" (Poch Poch), Gustavo Gili (2010),

Awards
 National Recognition to the Best in Public Art Projects Annually, Public Art Network, Americans for the Arts (2006).

References

External links
 http://redballproject.com/

Street art
Public art
Art
Street artists